Henry Hague Davis (September 10, 1885 – June 30, 1944) was a Canadian lawyer and Puisne Justice of the Supreme Court of Canada.

Born in Brockville, Ontario, the son of William Henry Davis and Eliza Dowsley, he received a Bachelor of Arts in 1907, a Master of Arts in 1909 and a Bachelor of Laws in 1911 all from the University of Toronto. He was called to the Ontario Bar in 1911 and then proceeded to practice law with the firm of Kilmer, McAndrew & Irving in Toronto. In 1933, he was appointed to the Ontario Court of Appeal.

In early 1935, he was appointed to the Supreme Court.  For reasons unknown, it had taken the federal government over a year to appoint Davis to replace Justice Smith, who had retired in late 1933.

Davis had been actively involved in the Canadian Bar Association while in practice, and maintained that involvement while on the Bench.  He was president of the Ontario Bar Association when appointed to the Court, and finished his term in that office.  He then served as national President of the Canadian Bar Association while on the Supreme Court.

Justice Davis served until his death on June 30, 1944, in Ottawa.

References

External links 
 Supreme Court of Canada biography

1885 births
1944 deaths
Justices of the Supreme Court of Canada
Justices of the Court of Appeal for Ontario
Canadian Bar Association Presidents
20th-century Canadian lawyers
Lawyers in Ontario
University of Toronto alumni
People from Brockville
University of Toronto Faculty of Law alumni